The 2002–03 La Liga season, the 72nd since its establishment, started on 31 August 2002 and finished on 22 June 2003.

Teams 
Twenty teams competed in the league – the top seventeen teams from the previous season and the three teams promoted from the Segunda División. The promoted teams were Atlético Madrid, Racing Santander and Recreativo, returning to the top flight after an absence of two, one and twenty three years respectively. They replaced Las Palmas, Tenerife and Zaragoza after spending time in the top flight for two, one and twenty four years respectively.

Team information

Clubs and locations 

2002–03 season was composed of the following clubs:

(*) Promoted from Segunda División.

League table

Results

Overall 
Most wins - Real Madrid, Real Sociedad, and Deportivo de La Coruña (22)
Fewest wins - Rayo Vallecano (7)
Most draws - Málaga CF and Espanyol (13)
Fewest draws - Racing Santander (5)
Most losses - Racing Santander and Rayo Vallecano (20)
Fewest losses - Real Madrid (4)
Most goals scored - Real Madrid (86)
Fewest goals scored - Rayo Vallecano (31)
Most goals conceded - Deportivo Alavés (68)
Fewest goals conceded - Valencia (35)

Awards

Pichichi Trophy 
The Pichichi Trophy is awarded to the player who scores the most goals in a season.

Fair Play award 
Real Madrid was the winner of the Fair-play award, with 76 points; second was Real Sociedad; and third was Deportivo La Coruña.

Pedro Zaballa award 
Real Sociedad supporters

Hat-tricks

Signings 
Source: http://www.bdfutbol.com/es/t/t2001-02.html 
Players on loan are marked on italics.

See also 
 2002–03 Segunda División
 2002–03 Copa del Rey

References 

La Liga seasons
1
Spain